Matthew Blake (born 17 March 1983) is a former professional rugby league footballer who played in the 2000s.

References

1983 births
Living people
Barrow Raiders players
English rugby league players
Gloucestershire All Golds players
Place of birth missing (living people)
Rugby league props
Wakefield Trinity players